Raymond Earl Baldwin (August 31, 1893 – October 4, 1986) was an American politician who served as a United States senator from Connecticut and also as the 72nd and 74th Governor of Connecticut. A conservative Republican, he was elected governor of Connecticut in 1938 during a Republican landslide promising a balanced budget, government aid to private business, and lower taxes. He sharply cut the state budget, producing a million dollars surplus. He was defeated for reelection in 1940, but was elected governor again in 1942 and 1944. He supervised a complex system of civil defense and statewide services on the homefront during the war. He planned an elaborate program to deal with the postwar reconversion of Connecticut's many warplane and munitions plants. He was elected to the Senate in the Republican landslide of 1946. As a spokesman for the small businesses of America, he compiled a conservative record in favor of less regulation, except for more regulation of labor unions through the Taft–Hartley Act. As chairman of a subcommittee of the Armed Services committee, Baldwin engaged in a long-running dispute with Wisconsin Senator Joseph McCarthy. McCarthy alleged that Baldwin was whitewashing an episode in which Army prosecutors in 1944 gained the death penalty for German soldiers accused of massacring Americans at the Malmedy Massacre. Exhausted by the highly publicized controversy, Baldwin resigned from the Senate in December 1949 to become a state judge.

Early life
Baldwin was born in 1893 in Rye, New York, the son of Sarah Emily (Tyler) and Lucian Earl Baldwin. He moved to Middletown, Connecticut, and attended public schools. He graduated from Wesleyan University in Middletown in 1916, and entered Yale University. However, upon the declaration of war, he enlisted in the United States Navy. He was assigned to officers' training school and was commissioned an ensign in February 1918, and promoted to lieutenant (j.g.) in September 1918. He resigned from the Navy in August 1919 and returned to Yale Law School, graduating in 1921. He was admitted to the bar in 1921 and practiced in New Haven and Bridgeport. He married Edith Lindholm on June 29, 1922, and they had three sons.

Career

Baldwin was prosecutor of the Stratford Town Court from 1927 to 1930, and was judge of that court from 1931 to 1933. He was a member of the Connecticut House of Representatives from 1931 to 1933, serving as majority leader in 1933. He resumed the practice of law from 1933 to 1938, and was town chairman of Stratford from 1935 to 1937.

Baldwin was Governor of Connecticut in 1939 and 1940, and the first governor to use the Governor's Mansion located on Prospect Avenue in Hartford.  He was an unsuccessful candidate for reelection to the office in 1940. An early supporter of Wendell Willkie, he saw to it that the Connecticut delegation at the 1940 Republican Convention, would back Wilkie which was crucial to beat frontrunners Thomas Dewey, Robert A. Taft, and Arthur Vandenberg. Willkie had unofficially promised Baldwin the spot as his running mate, but party leaders pressured Willkie to name Charles McNary instead, and Baldwin graciously stepped aside from contention. He was also a delegate in 1944 and 1948.

Again elected Governor in 1942 and 1944, Baldwin served until his resignation on December 27, 1946. During his tenure, he eliminated the state deficit without raising taxes; initiated a job-training program; created an inter-racial commission, and reformed the minor court system. Also instituted were a Connecticut Veterans Advisory and Reemployment Commission; and a labor management council.  He was elected United States Senator as a Republican on November 5, 1946, to fill the vacancy in the term ending January 3, 1947, caused by the death of Francis T. Maloney. At the same time he was elected for the term commencing January 3, 1947, and served from December 27, 1946, until his resignation on December 16, 1949.

From 1949 to 1959 Baldwin was an associate justice of the Connecticut Supreme Court of Errors (now the Supreme Court of Connecticut); was appointed chief justice in 1959 and served until his retirement in 1963. He was chairman of the Connecticut Constitutional Convention in 1965.

Death
Baldwin died in Fairfield, Connecticut on October 4, 1986 and is interred at Indian Hill Cemetery, Middletown, Connecticut.

A member of the Connecticut State Library Committee and its successor, the State Library Board, from 1957 to 1982; Baldwin served as its chair for many years. In tribute to his service, the board renamed the State Library's museum the Raymond E. Baldwin Museum of Connecticut History in 1983. The Raymond E. Baldwin Bridge that carries the Connecticut Turnpike (I-95) across the Connecticut River is also named for him. The Middlesex Judicial District courthouse in Middletown, as well as the Baldwin Center, a senior citizens center in Stratford, are named in his honor.

References

Further reading
 Curtiss S. Johnson. Raymond E. Baldwin: Connecticut Statesman (Chester, Connecticut, 1972) 
  Eleonora W. Schoenebaum, ed. Political Profiles: The Truman Years (1978) pp 18–19

External links
 

Govtrack US Congress
The Political Graveyard
National Governors Association
Connecticut State Library

1893 births
1986 deaths
Burials at Indian Hill Cemetery
United States Navy officers
Candidates in the 1948 United States presidential election
Republican Party governors of Connecticut
Republican Party members of the Connecticut House of Representatives
Wesleyan University alumni
Yale Law School alumni
Republican Party United States senators from Connecticut
Lawyers from Fairfield, Connecticut
Military personnel from Connecticut
20th-century American politicians
Justices of the Connecticut Supreme Court
Chief Justices of the Connecticut Supreme Court
20th-century American judges
20th-century American lawyers
20th-century American Episcopalians
Old Right (United States)